John Ross Turtle  OF (born 13 January 1937) is an Australian medical academic and endocrinologist. 

In 1992, he was appointed Officer in the Order of Australia. Subsequently, he was appointed Officer in the Order of Fiji in recognition of work in the field of diabetes internationally.

Turtle was elected as the Honorary President of the International Diabetes Federation, Honorary Life Member of the Australian Diabetes Society and the Endocrine Society of Australia. He was appointed as Emeritus Professor of the University of Sydney in 2002.

Life
Turtle was born in Sydney, Australia, and attended Newington College (1947-1953), commencing as a preparatory school student in Wyvern House. 

Turtle received his PhD in experimental social psychology from the University of Alberta, completed a Social Sciences and Humanities Research Council of Canada (SSHRC) postdoctoral fellowship at the University of British Columbia, and then worked for 4 years as an assistant professor at York University before coming to Ryerson in 1994.

Medical career
 Head, Royal Prince Alfred Hospital Endocrinology Department (1971-2002)
 Professor of Medicine, University of Sydney (1971-2002)
 Emeritus Professor (Since 2003)

Committees
 Vice-President, International Diabetes Federation (1991-1997)
 Member, Australian Drug Evaluation Committee (1972-1993)

Fellowships and honours
 Fellow, Royal College of Physicians
 Fellow, Royal Australasian College of Physicians
 Officer, Order of Australia (1992)
 Officer, Order of Fiji (1999)

Publications 
 A Normal Life with Diabetes - jointly (1972)
 The Diabetic Gourmet - jointly (1975)
 Life with Diabetes - jointly (1982)
 Diabetes in the New Millennium - jointly (1999)

References

1937 births
Living people
Australian endocrinologists
Academic staff of the University of Sydney
University of Sydney alumni
People educated at Newington College
Members of Newington College Council
Officers of the Order of Australia
Fellows of the Royal College of Physicians